Charlotte Dauphin (born 1987) is a French filmmaker, producer, screenwriter, and designer.

Biography
Dauphin was born in Paris, France in 1987. She trained in France as a ballet dancer before graduating from University of London (Courtauld Institute of Art) and the Royal Academy of Dramatic Arts. Later, Dauphin studied filmmaking at the University of Southern California.

She is the daughter of Chantal Lajous and Laurent Dauphin. Following her father's death, she became the only grandchild and heir to Jacques Dauphin and Dauphin O.T.A., one of the oldest European media houses in poster art and billboard advertising.

Career
She is the founder and artistic director of the contemporary jewelry house Dauphin. Her work has been exhibited in film festivals around the world and in cultural institutions, such as at the Palais de Tokyo in Paris and the Serpentine Galleries in London. It is also part of the permanent collections of the MAD Museum of Paris.

Dauphin is also a filmmaker, screenwriter, producer and actor. In January 2020, she released her first feature film, L'Autre (The Other). It received a Best Actress Award for Àstrid Bergès-Frisbey at the Taormina Film Fest.

As a producer, she focuses on independent features and auteurs. The first feature she worked on was Dark Inclusion by Arthur Hariri. It won the Louis Delluc Prize for Best Film as well as several accolades at the César Awards. Dauphin has also produced films for Mia Hansen-Løve including Bergman Island, which was an official selection of the 2021 Cannes Film Festival.

Her work is referred to as minimal and poetic with influences from dance, technology, architecture and sculpture. It has appeared on Billie Eilish, Susan Sarandon, Alicia Vikander and Juliette Binoche.

Personal life
Dauphin is a member of the La Rochefoucauld family through her marriage to Charles de La Rochefoucauld. They married in a private ceremony at The Invalides on 17 March 2012.

Filmography

References

External links
Official website

Instagram

1987 births
French filmmakers
French film directors
French women film directors
French screenwriters
French women screenwriters
French film producers
French women film producers
Film people from Paris
Living people